Karaikal Arunachalam Thangavelu (15 January 1917 – 28 September 1994) popularly known as "Danaal Thangavelu", was an Indian actor and comedian popular in the 1950s to 1970s. Not known for physical, acrobatic comedy like his contemporaries J. P. Chandrababu and Nagesh, Thangavelu's humour is recognised for his impeccable timing in verbal agility and the characteristic twang of his delivery. He exclusively acted in Tamil films.

Early life 
Thangavelu was born on 15 January 1917, in Karaikal, but shifted at an early age to Tirumalairayanpattinam. He was one of three sons of Arunachalam and Karumammal. Due to Arunachalam's alcoholism, the family struggled for food every day. Karumammal died when Thangavelu was six years old, and Arunachalam remarried; Thangavelu's stepmother often abused him. Arunachalam left for Singapore to find better employment and Thangavelu was sent to live with his relatives, but they too abused and ill-treated him. As a child, Thangavelu was a music and theatre fan, often sneaking into halls to watch plays. He eventually joined the Rajambal Company troupe, and was taught acting and mentored originally by Yedhartham Ponnuswamy Pillai, and later by M. Kandaswamy Mudaliar.

Career 
Thangavelu spent nine years at Rajambal Company, and after Kandaswamy Mudaliar shifted to the film industry, he too did the same, debuting with a minor, uncredited role in Sathi Leelavathi (1936). Due to lack of success, Thangavelu quit films and survived on alms at a Murugan temple near Kanchipuram until actor M. M. Marappa saw his plight and brought him back into the acting field, this time in theatre. As a result, Thangavelu became more financially stable, and his father also returned to live with him. After a long sabbatical from films, Thangavelu returned to the field in 1951 with Manamagal; director N. S. Krishnan cast him after having already seen and liking his several stage performances. He followed it with a comical role in Singari the same year, through which he got the prefix "Danaal" after the often repeated word of his character. Films like Ponvayal and Panam Paduthum Padu (both released in 1954) were instrumental in establishing Thangavelu as a comedian. Throughout his career, Thangavelu acted only in Tamil films. He won the Tamil Nadu government's Kalaimamani in 1968 and Kalaivanar award in 1989.

Personal life 
Thangavelu was originally married to Rajamani. He later married actress M. Saroja who was his pair in more than 50 films. Despite their age difference, they loved and married in Madurai Murugan temple during the 100th day celebration of their film Kalyana Parisu.

Death 
Thangavelu died on 28 September 1994 at his house in Chennai, Tamil Nadu.

Partial filmography

References

External links 
 

1917 births
1994 deaths
20th-century comedians
Actors in Tamil theatre
Indian male comedians
Indian male film actors
Indian Tamil people
Male actors from Tamil Nadu
Male actors in Tamil cinema
People from Karaikal district
Tamil comedians
Tamil male actors